The Peregrine Way is the first full-length album by the power metal/progressive metal band by Viathyn. It was released physically and digitally in 2010.

Track listing

Personnel
Tomislav Crnkovic – vocals, lead and rhythm guitars, acoustic guitars
David Crnkovic – drums, keyboards
Jacob Wright – lead and rhythm guitars, acoustic guitars
Alex Kot – bass, acoustic guitars

Session musicians 
 Sacha Laskow - guest guitar solo in “Sirenum Scopuli”
 Camille Austria - female vocals in “Sirenum Scopuli” & “Through the Orchard”

Technical staff 
 Sacha Laskow - mastering

References

External links
 http://viathyn.bandcamp.com/album/the-peregrine-way

2011 albums